Guyana (previously known as British Guiana) is a South American country that is culturally part of the Anglophone Caribbean and is one of the regions which make up the West Indies cricket team. It has produced international cricketers in all forms of the game—Tests, One Day Internationals (ODIs) and Twenty20 Internationals (T20Is). In 1928, against England, Maurice Fernandes became the first Guyanese player to represent the West Indies when he played in their inaugural Test match. In 1930 Fernandes became the first of seven Guyanese players to captain the West Indies. Clive Lloyd has captained the West Indies Test side a record 74 times.

Shivnarine Chanderpaul is the leading Guyanese run scorer in Tests and ODIs, having scored 11,867 runs in Tests and 8,778 in ODIs. With that being said, the only West Indian to have scored more than he did in tests is Brian Lara. Along with that the only West Indians to outscore him in one day internationals are Chris Gayle and Lara respectively. With 309 wickets, Lance Gibbs is the leading Guyanese wicket-taker in Tests. Colin Croft, Devendra Bishoo and Carl Hooper are the only other Guyanese players to have taken 100 Test wickets. With 193 wickets, Hooper has the most in ODIs than any other Guyanese player. Roger Harper is the only other Guyanese cricketer to take 100 ODI wickets.

Key
 Apps denotes the number of appearances the player has made.
 Runs denotes the number of runs scored by the player.
 Wkts denotes the number of wickets taken by the player.

Statistics correct as of: October 2022

See also
List of West Indies Test cricketers
List of West Indies ODI cricketers
List of West Indies Twenty20 International cricketers

Notes
 Lambert played 1 ODI for the United States

References

International cricketers from Guyana
Lists of Guyanese cricketers